William Lamont "Will" Smith (born January 13, 1992) is a former American football linebacker. He was a member of the Winnipeg Blue Bombers and Hamilton Tiger-Cats in the Canadian Football League (CFL). He played college football at Texas Tech University.

Early years
Smith attended Notre Dame High School, where he competed in football, basketball and ran track. He received honorable-mention All-county honors in both football and basketball.

College career
He began his college career playing football at the NCAA Division II level at Northwood University. He appeared in 8 games in 2010 as a freshman, making 22 tackles (one for loss) and one forced fumble. After the season, he transferred to Riverside City College in his hometown

As a sophomore he started 11 games, registering 88 tackles (second on the team), 13 tackles for loss, 1.5 sacks, 4 fumble recoveries, 3 interceptions (one returned for a 75-yard touchdown), while helping the team to a perfect 11–0 record and a number 5 national ranking. At the end of the year, he announced his intention to transfer to NCAA Division I Texas Tech University in 2012.

As a junior, he played in all 13 games (11 starts), collecting 55 tackles (1.5 for loss), 34 solo tackles and 3 quarterback hurries. His performance would earn him a third-team All-Big 12 selection by Phil Steele and an honorable-mention by the AP.

Smith's senior season in 2013 earned him several accolades. He started 13 games, posting 120 tackles (third in the conference), 86 solo tackles (led the conference), 10.5 tackles for loss, 4.5 sacks, and a fumble return for a touchdown. He had 18 tackles against the University of Texas. His mark of 120 tackles was the most by a Red Raider since the NCAA record setting Lawrence Flugence's 193 in 2002.

For his performances throughout the season, Smith earned Holiday Bowl defensive MVP honors, as well as first-team All-Big 12 Conference selections by the Associated Press and the Big 12 Broadcasters.

Professional career

Dallas Cowboys (first stint)
Smith was selected by the Dallas Cowboys in the seventh round (238th overall) of the 2014 NFL Draft. He was waived on August 29 and signed to the practice squad. He was released to make room for defensive end Michael Sam on September 3.

Winnipeg Blue Bombers
On October 10, 2014, he was signed by the Winnipeg Blue Bombers of the Canadian Football League to their practice roster.  He was released on October 29 after playing in one game, so he could re-join the Dallas Cowboys.

Dallas Cowboys (second stint)
On October 29, 2014, Smith was re-signed to the practice squad. On May 14, 2015, he was cut after rookie minicamp, to make room for tryout linebacker Donnie Baggs. He was re-signed on August 1, taking the roster spot created by the holdout of defensive end Jeremy Mincey. He was released on August 25 with a groin injury.

Hamilton Tiger-Cats (CFL)
On May 28, 2016, he was signed by the Hamilton Tiger-Cats of the Canadian Football League. He appeared in 11 games as a backup linebacker, posting 3 tackles (one for loss) and 9 special teams tackles.

Winnipeg Blue Bombers (second stint)
On February 16, 2017, he was signed by the Winnipeg Blue Bombers of the Canadian Football League. He was released on May 1.

Los Angeles Wildcats (XFL)
In October 2019, he was selected by the Los Angeles Wildcats in the 2020 XFL Supplemental Draft. In March, amid the COVID-19 pandemic, the league announced that it would be cancelling the rest of the season. Playing in all 5 games, he registered 28 tackles and one interception. He had his contract terminated when the league suspended operations on April 10, 2020.

References

External links
Texas Tech bio

1992 births
Living people
Sportspeople from Riverside, California
Players of American football from Riverside, California
Players of Canadian football from California
African-American players of American football
American football linebackers
Canadian football linebackers
American players of Canadian football
Northwood Timberwolves football players
Riverside City Tigers football players
Texas Tech Red Raiders football players
Dallas Cowboys players
Hamilton Tiger-Cats players
Los Angeles Wildcats (XFL) players
21st-century African-American sportspeople